The Nebraska City Bridge is a four-lane girder bridge over the Missouri River connecting Otoe County, Nebraska with Fremont County, Iowa at Nebraska City, Nebraska.

The bridge built in 1986 bypasses the central business district and replaced the Waubonsie Bridge truss bridge which opened in 1930 and went towards the middle of town. The Waubonsie Bridge built by the Kansas City Bridge Company called itself "The Bridge with a State park at Each End" because Arbor Lodge State Park was on the Nebraska side and Waubonsie State Park was on the Iowa side.

The Waubonsie Bridge replaced a pontoon bridge built in 1888 that claimed to be the largest drawbridge of its kind in the world.

Local usage refers to the new bridge just as "the Missouri River Bridge."

The bridge was constructed as part of a highway plan to provide four-lane access between Lincoln, Nebraska and Interstate 29 in Iowa.  The bridge connects Nebraska Highway 2 with Iowa Highway 2.

The bridge was closed to all traffic in April 2019 as a result of the 2019 Midwestern U.S. floods. The bridge reopened with one lane of travel in each direction on August 1, 2019.

See also
List of crossings of the Missouri River

References

External links
 Iowa Route 2
 
 Waubonsie Bridge postcard

Bridges over the Missouri River
Road bridges in Iowa
Road bridges in Nebraska
Bridges completed in 1986
Buildings and structures in Nebraska City, Nebraska
Buildings and structures in Fremont County, Iowa
Bridges completed in 1888
Pontoon bridges in the United States
Bridges completed in 1930
Truss bridges in the United States
Girder bridges in the United States
Interstate vehicle bridges in the United States